Harmonic usually refers to the frequency components of a time-varying signal, such as a musical note.

Mathematics, science and engineering 
 Harmonic (mathematics), a number of concepts in mathematics
 Harmonic analysis, representing signals by superposition of basic waves
 Harmonic oscillator, a concept in classical mechanics
 Simple harmonic motion, a concept in classical mechanics
 Harmonic distortion, a measurement of signal distortion
 Harmonics (electrical power)
 Harmonic series (mathematics), a divergent infinite series
 Harmonic tremor, a rhythmic earthquake which may indicate volcanic activity

Music 
 String harmonic, a string instrument playing technique
 Artificial harmonic, a string instrument playing technique
 Enharmonic, a "spelling" issue in music
 Harmonic series (music), the series of overtones (or partials) present in a musical note, or the vibrational modes of a string or an air column
 Scale of harmonics, a musical scale based on harmonic nodes of a string
 The Harmonics, a rock a cappella group from Stanford University
 Harmony, the musical use of simultaneous pitches, or chords
 Inharmonicity, the degree of overtones' departure from integral multiples of the fundamental frequency
 Overtone, any resonant frequency higher than the fundamental frequency

Other uses 
 Harmonic (color), a relationship between three colors
 Harmonic Convergence, a New Age astrological term
 "Harmonics", the twelfth movement of Mike Oldfield's Tubular Bells 2003 album
 Harmonic Inc., a video infrastructure product company, headquartered in San Jose, California

See also
 Harmonix, a video game development company